Onnuri may refer to:

 Onnuri Community Church, a South Korean megachurch
 RV Onnuri, a Korean research vessel built in Norway